National Road 8 (also known as Tallinn-Paldiski maantee; Tallinn-Paldiski highway) begins from Tallinn at Freedom Square. After this the road runs through the city for 10.7 km, after which it crosses the city limits. The Tallinn-Paldiski highway runs parallel to the northern coast of Estonia. The highway ends at Paldiski.

Route
The road is a part of the European route E265. The total length of the road is 47.2 km.

See also
 Transport in Estonia

References

External links

N8